Luis Roger Zenón Dreke (born 9 July 1953) is a Cuban footballer. He competed in the men's tournament at the 1980 Summer Olympics.

References

External links
 

1953 births
Living people
Cuban footballers
Cuba international footballers
Association football defenders
FC Matanzas players
Olympic footballers of Cuba
Footballers at the 1980 Summer Olympics
Pan American Games medalists in football
Pan American Games silver medalists for Cuba
Footballers at the 1979 Pan American Games
Place of birth missing (living people)
Medalists at the 1979 Pan American Games